Wall Township may refer to the following places in the United States:

Wall Township, Ford County, Illinois
Wall Township, New Jersey

See also
Walls Township, Traverse County, Minnesota